Zyad Barakat Chaabo (born 1 January 1979) is a Syrian former footballer who played as a striker.

Career statistics

International
Scores and results list Syria's goal tally first.

Honours
Hutteen
 Syrian Cup: 2000–01

Al-Jaish
 Syrian Premier League: 2001–02, 2002–03
 Syrian Cup: 2001–02, 2003–04
 AFC Cup: 2004

Al-Karamah
 Syrian Premier League: 2007–08
 Syrian Cup: 2007–08

Syria
 Nehru Cup runner-up: 2007
 West Asian Games runner-up: 2005

Individual
 Best Syrian Footballer: 2003
 Syrian Premier League top scorer: 2002–03
 Nehru Cup top scorer: 2007

References

External links
 
 Profile at syrialivesport.com

1979 births
Living people
People from Latakia
Association football forwards
Syrian footballers
Syria international footballers
Taliya SC players
Al-Karamah players
Persepolis F.C. players
Al-Jaish Damascus players
Hutteen Latakia players
Syrian expatriate footballers
Expatriate footballers in Iran
Syrian expatriate sportspeople in Iran
Syrian Premier League players